The United States Armed Forces uses a number of terms to define the magnitude and extent of nuclear and radiation accidents and incidents in order to reduce the time taken to report the type of incident, thus streamlining the radio communications in the wake of the event.

Origin
United States Department of Defense directive 5230.16, Nuclear Accident and Incident Public Affairs (PA) Guidance, Chairman Joint Chiefs of Staff Manual 3150.03B Joint Reporting Structure Event and Incident Reporting, and the United States Air Force Operation Reporting System, as set out in Air Force Instruction 10-206 detail a number of terms for reporting nuclear incidents internally and externally (including in press releases). They are used by the United States of America, and are neither NATO nor global standards.

Terminology

Pinnacle
Pinnacle is a Chairman of the Joint Chiefs of Staff OPREP-3 (Operational Event/Incident Report) reporting flagword used in the United States National Command Authority structure. The term "Pinnacle" denotes an incident of interest to the Major Commands, Department of Defense and National Command Authority, in that it:
 Generates a higher level of military action
 Causes a national reaction
 Affects international relationships
 Causes immediate widespread coverage in news media
 Is clearly against the national interest
 Affects current national policy

All of the following reporting terms are classified Pinnacle, with the exception of Bent Spear, Faded Giant and Dull Sword. AFI 10-206 notes that the flagword Pinnacle may be added to Bent Spear or Faded Giant to expedite reporting to the National Military Command Center (NMCC).

Bent Spear
Bent Spear refers to incidents involving nuclear weapons, warheads, components or vehicles transporting nuclear material that are of significant interest but are not categorized as Pinnacle – Nucflash or Pinnacle – Broken Arrow. Bent Spear incidents include violations or breaches of handling and security regulations.

An example of a Bent Spear incident occurred on the August 2007 flight of a B-52 bomber from Minot AFB to Barksdale AFB which mistakenly carried six cruise missiles with live nuclear warheads.

Broken Arrow
Broken Arrow refers to an accidental event that involves nuclear weapons, warheads or components that does not create a risk of nuclear war. These include:
 Accidental or unexplained nuclear explosion
 Non-nuclear detonation or burning of a nuclear weapon
 Radioactive contamination
 Loss in transit of nuclear asset with or without its carrying vehicle
 Jettisoning of a nuclear weapon or nuclear component
 Public hazard, actual or implied

Broken Arrow incidents 

The US Department of Defense has officially recognized at least 32 "Broken Arrow" incidents from 1950 to 1980.  Examples of these events include:

1950 British Columbia B-36 crash
1956 B-47 disappearance
1958 Mars Bluff B-47 nuclear weapon loss incident
1958 Tybee Island mid-air collision
1961 Yuba City B-52 crash
1961 Goldsboro B-52 crash
1964 Savage Mountain B-52 crash
1964 Bunker Hill AFB runway accident
1965 Philippine Sea A-4 incident
1966 Palomares B-52 crash
1968 Thule Air Base B-52 crash
1980 Damascus Titan missile explosion, Arkansas
Unofficially, the Defense Atomic Support Agency (now known as the Defense Threat Reduction Agency (DTRA)) has detailed hundreds of "Broken Arrow" incidents.

Nucflash 

Nucflash refers to detonation or possible detonation of a nuclear weapon which creates a risk of an outbreak of nuclear war. Events which may be classified Nucflash include:
 Accidental, unauthorized, or unexplained nuclear detonation or possible detonation.
 Accidental or unauthorized launch of a nuclear-armed or nuclear-capable missile in the direction of, or having the capability to reach, another nuclear-capable country.
 Unauthorized flight of, or deviation from an approved flight plan by, a nuclear-armed or nuclear-capable aircraft with the capability to penetrate the airspace of another nuclear-capable country.
 Detection of unidentified objects by a missile warning system or interference (experienced by such a system or related communications) that appears threatening and could create a risk of nuclear war.

This term is a report that has the highest precedence in the OPREP-3 reporting structure. All other reporting terms such as Broken Arrow, Empty Quiver, etc., while very important, are secondary to this report.

Emergency Disablement
Emergency Disablement refers to operations involving the emergency destruction of nuclear weapons.

Emergency Evacuation
Emergency Evacuation refers to operations involving the emergency evacuation of nuclear weapons.

Empty Quiver
Empty Quiver refers to the seizure, theft, or loss of a functioning nuclear weapon.

Faded Giant
Faded Giant refers to an event involving a military nuclear reactor or other radiological accident not involving nuclear weapons, such as the SL-1 reactor explosion.

Dull Sword
Dull Sword refers to reports of minor incidents involving nuclear weapons, components or systems, or which could impair their deployments. This could include actions involving vehicles capable of carrying nuclear weapons but with no nuclear weapons on board at the time of the accident. This also is used in reports of damage or deficiencies with equipment, tools, or diagnostic testers that are designed for use on nuclear weapons or the nuclear weapon release systems of nuclear-capable aircraft.

See also
 Lists of nuclear disasters and radioactive incidents
 List of military nuclear accidents
 Nuclear and radiation accidents
 United States and weapons of mass destruction

Notes and references

External links
 Annotated bibliography from the Alsos Digital Library for Nuclear Issues
 Department of Defense directive 5230.16
 AFMAN 10-206
 Taylor's Nuke Site – Broken Arrow Investigations

Nuclear incident terminology
Military nuclear accidents and incidents
Nuclear incident terminology
United States military nuclear incident terminology
Nuclear incident terminology
Nuclear weapon safety
War scare